HMS E46 was a British E class submarine built by Cammell Laird, Birkenhead. She was launched on 4 April 1916 and was commissioned in October 1916. HMS E46 was sold in South Wales on 6 September 1922.

Design
She was powered by two  Vickers eight-cylinder two-stroke diesel engines and two  electric motors.

E46 was armed with a 12-pounder  QF gun mounted forward of the conning tower. She had five 18 inch (450 mm) torpedo tubes, two in the bow, one either side amidships, and one in the stern; a total of 10 torpedoes were carried.

E-Class submarines had wireless systems with  power ratings; in some submarines, these were later upgraded to  systems by removing a midship torpedo tube. Their maximum design depth was  although in service some reached depths of below . Some submarines contained Fessenden oscillator systems.

References

Bibliography
 

 

British E-class submarines of the Royal Navy
Ships built on the River Mersey
1916 ships
World War I submarines of the United Kingdom
Royal Navy ship names